Justin Derek Bell (born 23 February 1968) is a British race car driver, who after a successful career behind the wheel, transitioned into the media world in front of the camera and established himself as one of the top US based automotive content hosts.  He is the son of Derek Bell.

Career
Like many successful car racers, Justin Bell nurtured and developed his passion for speed and competitive racing at an early age. With natural talent and the encouragement of his father Derek Bell, a five-time Le Mans 24 hours winner, he started out fast and got faster, and soon began carving his own place in history. Since beginning his career in 1988, Justin has achieved many significant racing accomplishments, including the 1997 FIA GT2 Championship, winning the 24 Hours of Le Mans GT2 class in 1998 and second-place finishes in Le Mans and Daytona, and a pair of SCCA Trans-Am wins.

Along the way he raced for major car manufacturers including Saab, Peugeot, Porsche, BMW, Dodge and General Motors. For Dodge Viper, he won the 1997 FIA GT2 world championship and the GT2 class at Le Mans in 1998. In 2000 Justin signed with General Motors as a driver for the factory Corvette Racing team, finishing second in the Daytona 24 Hours, the 24 Hours of Le Mans and Petit Le Mans.

Early in his career, as Justin made consistent progress through a variety of racing categories, all the while appearing in various television programs. In 1993, he was co-host of the motor sports television program 555 Performance World, which ran on Asia's largest satellite network Star TV and was seen by over 80 million viewers. This led to him hosting a six-part series, The International Young Driver of the Year on BBC television.

Since 2005 Justin has worked frequently with Speed Channel (now Fox Sports 1) as a host of various live and format based TV shows, such as the Barrett Jackson Auctions, American Le Mans Series, Grand American Racing, IMSA WeatherTech SportsCar Championship, Test Drive and Shut up and Drive.

Justin co-founded Torque Media Group in 2018 with Tommy Kendall and Jason Jacobson. Breaking with the traditional TV model the trio created The Torque Show as a branded Livestream Show to support Michelin in the IMSA Series. Evolving into a vibrant chat show style format, JB and TK interview the highest profile people in the Sportscar world, attracting a huge audience on their Facebook Live channel.

Another series integrated into The Torque Show is 'The Love of Cars' presented by Hagerty, which has seen guests such as Jay Leno, Patrick Dempsey and Danny Trejo.

Drawing on their vast experience in Live sports broadcasting, and led by the producing talents of Jason Jacobson, the company branched out into live event hosting with the Audrain Newport Concours and Motorweek and the incredibly prestigious honor of hosting and producing the livestream for the Pebble beach Concours d'Elegance in 2021.

Other career milestones.  Justin and his father raced together in the 1992 24 Hours of Le Mans and the 1995 24 Hours of Le Mans. He tried to qualify for the 1996 Indianapolis 500 in a 4 year old Lola chassis. Later in 1997, he won the FIA GT championship in the GT2 class in a Dodge Viper GTS-R, racing for Team Oreca. From 2000 to 2004 he had his own racing school which trained the pupils with Chevrolet Corvette cars. In 2001-2003 he raced in the Trans Am Series, winning two major races at Houston and Mazda Raceway Laguna Seca and took the Rookie of the Year title.  In 2009 Bell debuted as the driving instructor for the celebrities on The Jay Leno Show where he also interviews the celebrity for the website.

Complete 24 Hours of Le Mans results

Complete Japanese Touring Car Championship (1994-) results

IRL IndyCar Series

References

1968 births
English racing drivers
Rolex Sports Car Series drivers
Indy Lights drivers
Trans-Am Series drivers
24 Hours of Le Mans drivers
Brighton Speed Trials people
Living people
People from Rustington
English expatriates in the United States
24 Hours of Daytona drivers
World Sportscar Championship drivers
Barber Pro Series drivers
Japanese Touring Car Championship drivers
Corvette Racing drivers
Oreca drivers
David Price Racing drivers
AF Corse drivers